Picea retroflexa, the Tapao Shan spruce, is a species of conifer in the family Pinaceae that is endemic to China, growing in West Sichuan, Kangding, Jiuzhaigou (Zheduo Shan), Qinghai, and Ban Ma Xian. Its limited habitat is threatened by habitat loss due to logging, fires, and grazing.

References

retroflexa
Endemic flora of China
Flora of Sichuan
Trees of China
Vulnerable flora of Asia
Taxonomy articles created by Polbot